
Gmina Kałuszyn is an urban-rural gmina (administrative district) in Mińsk County, Masovian Voivodeship, in east-central Poland.

Villages
Apart from the town of Kałuszyn, Gmina Kałuszyn contains the villages and settlements of Abramy, Budy Przytockie, Chrościce, Falbogi, Garczyn Duży, Garczyn Mały, Gołębiówka, Kazimierzów, Kluki, Leonów, Marianka, Marysin, Milew, Mroczki, Nowe Groszki, Olszewice, Patok, Piotrowina, Przytoka, Ryczołek, Sinołęka, Stare Groszki, Szembory, Szymony, Wąsy, Wity, Wólka Kałuska, Żebrówka and Zimnowoda.

Neighbouring gminas
Gmina Kałuszyn is bordered by the gminas of Cegłów, Dobre, Grębków, Jakubów, Kotuń, Mrozy and Wierzbno.

References

Polish official population figures 2006

Kaluszyn
Mińsk County